Paul E. Pfeifer (born October 15, 1942) is an American jurist. He served in both houses of the Ohio General Assembly as a member of the Ohio Republican party and was most recently an associate justice of the Supreme Court of Ohio.

Pfeifer was born in Bucyrus in 1942. He grew up on his family's dairy farm near Bucyrus. As a teenager, he raised purebred Yorkshire hogs to finance his college education.
He earned a bachelor of arts degree in economics, political science, and history in 1963 from Ohio State University. In 1966, he also earned a law degree from the College of Law.

Pfeifer owns a cattle farm in Crawford County, near his childhood home. Pfeifer and his wife Julia have three children and four grandchildren.

Law practice 
From 1967 to 1970, he worked as an assistant attorney general under Ohio Attorney General William B. Saxbe. Pfeifer practiced law – tax and trial law – as a partner with the firm Cory, Brown & Pfeifer from 1972 to 1992. From 1973 to 1976, he also served as an assistant to the Crawford County prosecutor.

Political career

Ohio House of Representatives
In 1970, Pfeifer was elected to the Ohio House of Representatives. Pfeifer served as an Ohio state representative from 1971 to 1972. In 1976, he successfully ran for a seat in the Ohio Senate. Pfeifer was re-elected in 1980, 1984, and 1988. From 1983 to 1984, Pfeifer was minority floor leader and from 1985 to 1986, with a Republican majority in the Senate, Pfeifer became Assistant President Pro Tempore.

Election bids
In 1982, Pfeifer ran for the U.S. Senate, but was defeated by incumbent Democrat Howard Metzenbaum.

In 1990, Pfeifer ran for Ohio attorney general, losing to Democrat Lee Fisher by a narrow margin of just over 1,200 votes. Claiming that there were discrepancies between the total number of ballots cast and the number of signatures in the polling books, Pfeifer appealed to the Ohio Supreme Court to review the results, but the court refused.

Ohio Supreme Court justice 
In 1992, Pfeifer was elected to the Ohio Supreme Court, defeating John T. Patton. In 1998, he was re-elected to the court, defeating Ronald Suster. Pfeifer was unopposed in his bid for re-election in 2004 and 2010. He retired January 1, 2017 when he was forced to leave the court after exceeding the age of 70, the mandatory retirement age for judges in Ohio. Pfeifer, as the longest serving associate Justice, became acting Chief Justice on April 2, 2010 upon the death of Chief Justice Thomas Moyer. Pfeifer remained in that capacity until May 3, 2010, when Franklin County Probate Court Judge Eric Brown,  who was appointed Chief Justice by Governor Ted Strickland, took office.

Although nominally Republican, Pfeifer was often aligned with the Democratic minority on the Court.

References

External links

1942 births
Living people
Republican Party members of the Ohio House of Representatives
Ohio State University Moritz College of Law alumni
Ohio State University College of Arts and Sciences alumni
Republican Party Ohio state senators
Justices of the Ohio Supreme Court
People from Bucyrus, Ohio